Belarus competed at the 2000 Summer Olympics in Sydney, Australia. 139 competitors, 72 men and 67 women, took part in 109 events in 20 sports. Belarus had its best ever showing both in terms of gold and overall medals at these games. The gold medal result will be later matched in 2008.

Medalists

Archery

In its second Olympic archery competition, Belarus was represented by two women. They were not as successful as they had been four years earlier, but two of the archers still won in their first matches.

Athletics

Men
Road events

Field events

Women
Track & road events

Field events

Combined events - Heptathlon

Boxing

Men

Canoeing

Sprint
Men

Women

Diving

Men

Women

Fencing

Four fencers, all men, represented Belarus in 2000.
Men

Gymnastics

Men
Team

Individual finals

Women
Team

Individual finals

Judo

Men

Modern pentathlon

Rhythmic gymnastics

Individual

Team

Rowing

Women

Sailing

Men

Women

Open

M = Medal race; EL = Eliminated – did not advance into the medal race; CAN = Race cancelled

Shooting

Men

Women

Swimming

Men

Women

Synchronized swimming

Table tennis

Men

Women

Tennis

Men

Women

Trampolining

Weightlifting

Men

Women

Wrestling

Freestyle

Greco-Roman

Notes

Wallechinsky, David (2004). The Complete Book of the Summer Olympics (Athens 2004 Edition). Toronto, Canada. . 
International Olympic Committee (2001). The Results. Retrieved 12 November 2005.
Sydney Organising Committee for the Olympic Games (2001). Official Report of the XXVII Olympiad Volume 1: Preparing for the Games. Retrieved 20 November 2005.
Sydney Organising Committee for the Olympic Games (2001). Official Report of the XXVII Olympiad Volume 2: Celebrating the Games. Retrieved 20 November 2005.
Sydney Organising Committee for the Olympic Games (2001). The Results. Retrieved 20 November 2005.
International Olympic Committee Web Site

References

Nations at the 2000 Summer Olympics
2000
Summer Olympics